Armand Robinson (born December 8, 1987) is a former American football wide receiver who played in the Arena Football League.

Biography
Robinson played college football for the Miami RedHawks. In four seasons (2007–2010), he appeared in 50 games while recording 210 receptions for 2550 yards and 15 touchdowns.

Robinson signed a free agent contract with the Pittsburgh Steelers in 2011 as an undrafted rookie. In four preseason games, he had two receptions for 27 yards. He did not play in any regular season NFL games.

In 2012, Robinson played in the Arena Football League for the Kansas City Command. He recorded 47 receptions for 519 yards and nine touchdowns.

After his professional football career, Robinson went on to become a financial advisor.

References

1987 births
Living people
American football wide receivers
Kansas City Command players
Miami RedHawks football players
People from Reynoldsburg, Ohio